Out Wood is a  biological Site of Special Scientific Interest east of Charlbury in Oxfordshire.

This semi-natural wood is a surviving fragment of the medieval Royal Forest of Wychwood. It is overgrown coppice with standards, and the standards are oaks between 30 and 150 years old. Rides have a diverse ground flora, including meadow saffron, broad-leaved helleborine and greater butterfly orchid.

References

 
Sites of Special Scientific Interest in Oxfordshire